Ron Chatman (born August 30, 1971) is a goofy-footed American skateboarder.

Skateboarding
Chatman was an early rider for World Industries; as well as team captain. Chatman was featured in the 1989 World Industries video: Rubbish Heap, alongside skaters Jeremy Klein, Mike Vallely, Chris Pastras, Steve Rocco, and others. He also rode for Tracker Trucks. After World Industries, Chatman rode for Milk, ATM Click, and 60/40.

References

External links
chrome ball interview #41: ron chatman
Ron Chatman skate videos - Skate Video Site

1971 births
American skateboarders
Living people
African-American skateboarders
21st-century African-American sportspeople
20th-century African-American sportspeople